Phool Bane Patthar ( Flower turned into rock) is a 1996 Indian Hindi-language action film directed by Ambrish Sangal, starring Mohnish Behl, Avinash Wadhawan, Kiran Kumar, Tiku Talsania and Kader Khan.

Plot
Jaspal Choudhary, an Assistant Commissioner of Police transfers to a police station where gangster Choudhry Bhavani Singh controls the area. Corrupt police officers are involve with Bhawani. Jaspal is killed by the goons of Bhawani Singh. His only daughter, Vineeta swears to avenge the death of her father.

Cast

 Avinash Wadhawan as Raj
 Indrani Banerjee as Vineeta
 Mohnish Behl as Baliya Singh
 Kiran Kumar as ACP Jaspal
 Tiku Talsania as Police Constable Munnu
 Kader Khan as Bhavani Singh
 Mohan Joshi as Garibdas Singh
 Rakesh Bedi as Havaldar Chunnu
 Avtar Gill as Tejpal Singh
 Jack Gaud
 Vinod Talwar

Soundtrack
"Chhuo Na Tum Mujhko Aise" - Alisha Chinoy, Bali Brahmbhatt
"Main Hoon Haseena" - Kavita Paudwal
"Main Jab Sochta Hoon Tumhein" - Udit Narayan, Anuradha Paudwal
"Meri Jaan Tu Tu Tu" - Abhijeet, Anuradha Paudwal
"Mujhe Teri Adaaon Ne Paagal" - Udit Narayan, Anuradha Paudwal

References

External links

1996 films
1990s Hindi-language films
Indian action drama films